The 2008 BFGoodrich Langstreckenmeisterschaft (BFGLM) season was the 31st season of the VLN.

Calendar

Race Results
Results indicate overall winners only.

References

External links 
 
 

2008 in German motorsport
Nürburgring Endurance Series seasons